Caipora is an extinct genus of large New World monkey that lived during the Pleistocene. It contains a single species, Caipora bambuiorum. Fossils have been found only in Brazil's Toca da Boa Vista cave, alongside the larger Protopithecus. The presence of these two large arboreal monkeys in Bahia suggests that the region may have supported a dense forest during the Late Pleistocene.

Taxonomy
Caipora bambuiorum is known from an almost complete skeleton of a late-stage subadult individual discovered in the Toca da Boa Vista cave in 1992, by the spelaeological team Grupo Bambui de Pesquisas Espeleologicas. Its generic name is derived from caipora, a figure in Brazilian folklore, while the specific name was given in honour of the Grupo Bambui.

Description

Caipora was a large-bodied monkey: despite the subadult age of the type specimen, its postcranial skeleton is more robust than any living New World monkey, but not as robust as Protopithecus, and the individual is estimated to have weighed around 20.5 kilograms. Its upper limbs are very long, and the neurocranium is more rounded than is typical in New World monkeys. Like the extant genera Ateles and Brachyteles, it may have been a specialised suspensory climber and clamberer.

References

†Caipora
Pleistocene primates
Pleistocene mammals of South America
Lujanian
Pleistocene Brazil
Fossils of Brazil
Fossil taxa described in 1996